James Manahan (March 12, 1866 – January 8, 1932) was a U.S. Representative from Minnesota.

Manahan was born near Chatfield in Fillmore County, Minnesota to Irish immigrant parents. He graduated from the Normal School of Winona, Minnesota in 1886.  For two years, he worked as a school teacher in Graceville. He later attended the University of Wisconsin Law School, and eventually earned his law degree from the University of Minnesota at Minneapolis in 1889.  Having been admitted to the bar the same year, he began practicing law in St. Paul, later relocating his practice to Lincoln, Nebraska in 1895.  He moved back to Minneapolis in 1905, and practiced law there until 1912, when he was elected as a Republican to the Sixty-third Congress (March 4, 1913 – March 3, 1915).  He declined to be a candidate for renomination in 1914, and resumed his law practice.  He died in St. Paul in 1932.

References

1866 births
1932 deaths
American people of Irish descent
People from Fillmore County, Minnesota
University of Wisconsin Law School alumni
University of Minnesota Law School alumni
Republican Party members of the United States House of Representatives from Minnesota